Bearsville Records was founded in 1970 by Albert Grossman. Artists included Todd Rundgren, Elizabeth Barraclough, Foghat, Halfnelson/Sparks, Bobby Charles, Randy VanWarmer, Paul Butterfield's Better Days, Lazarus, Jesse Winchester, and NRBQ. The label closed in 1984, two years before Grossman's death. Sally Grossman, Albert Grossman’s widow, was running Bearsville Records from 2010 until her death in March 2021, at the age of 81.

Bearsville's initial distributor was Ampex Records. From 1972 until its folding, the label was distributed by Warner Bros. Records in most countries. In the UK it was distributed by Warner until 1979, and then Island until 1981; its last few British releases were licensed to independent labels Avatar and Lamborghini. Rhino Records currently distributes the Bearsville catalog.

Many of the artists on the roster recorded at Grossman's Bearsville Studios.

Notable artists

Elizabeth Barraclough
Paul Butterfield
Jonathan Cain
Felix Cavaliere
Bobby Charles
The dB's
Foghat
Jesse Frederick
Nick Jameson
Norma Jean Wright
Lazarus
Liar
Willie Mitchell
NRBQ
Roger Powell
Todd Rundgren
Utopia
Randy Vanwarmer
Jesse Winchester
Sparks

Discography

1970 (under AMPEX distribution)
The American Dream - The American Dream 
Gil Evans - Gil Evans
Great Speckled Bird - Great Speckled Bird 
Jesse Winchester - Jesse Winchester 
Todd Rundgren - Runt 1005

1971
Jericho - Jericho 
Todd Rundgren - Runt. The Ballad of Todd Rundgren 10116
Switched from AMPEX distribution to Warner Bros. using Reprise Records 2000 catalog number sequence.
Jesse Frederick - Jesse Frederick This was the first album to be released by Bearsville under Warner Bros. distribution. This release was a Bearsville / Reprise records release as noted on the back cover but used a Bearsville label on the LP.
Lazarus - Lazarus

1972
Sparks - Half Nelson 
Todd Rundgren - Something/Anything? 2BX 2066
Hungry Chuck - Hungry Chuck 
Foghat - Foghat BR 2077
Jesse Winchester - Third Down, 110 to Go 
Bobby Charles - Bobby Charles 
Paul Butterfield - Better Days

1973
Sparks - A Woofer in Tweeter's Clothing 
Todd Rundgren - A Wizard, A True Star BR 2133
Lazarus - A Fool's Paradise 
Foghat - Foghat (Rock & Roll) BR 2136
Jean Yves Labat - M. Frog 
Paul Butterfield - It All Comes Back
Todd Rundgren - Todd Rundgren's Rack Job 2BV 2156 (Unreleased two record set of Rundgren's first two solo albums "Runt" and "Runt - The Ballad Of Todd Rundgren") 
Foghat - Energized BR 6950 First Bearsville release using its own 6000 catalog number sequence

1974
Todd Rundgren - Todd 2BR 6952 (ORIGINAL NUMBER 2BR 2169, DELAYED 1973 RELEASE)
Jesse Winchester - Learn to Love it 
Todd Rundgren - Todd Rundgren's Utopia BR 6954
Felix Cavaliere - Felix Cavaliere  BR 6955 
Foghat - Rock and Roll Outlaws BR 6956

1975
Todd Rundgren - Initiation BR 6957 
Felix Cavaliere - Destiny BR 6958
Foghat - Fool For the City BR 6959
Paul Butterfield - Put It In Your Ear BR 6960
Utopia - Another Live BR 6961

1976
Foghat - Night Shift BR 6962
Todd Rundgren - Faithful BR 6963
Jesse Winchester - Let the Rough Side Drag BR 6964

1977
Utopia - RA BR 6965
Tony Wilson - I Like Your Style
Jesse Winchester - Nothing But a Breeze
Jonathan Cain Band - Windy City Breakdown
Utopia - Oops! Wrong Planet BR 6970
Foghat - Foghat Live BR 6971
Nick Jameson - Already Free BR 6972

1978
Foghat - Stone Blue BRK 6977
Foghat - Fool For The City BRK 6980 (Re Issue)
Jesse Winchester - A Touch on the Rainy Side
Todd Rundgren - Hermit of Mink Hollow BRK 6981
Elizabeth Barraclough - Elizabeth Barraclough BRK 6978
Liar - Set the World on Fire
Norma Jean Wright - Norma Jean
Todd Rundgren - Back to the Bars 2BRX 6986

1979
Tony Wilson - Catch One
Randy Vanwarmer - Warmer
Elizabeth Barraclough - Hi!
Foghat - Boogie Motel BRK 6990
Utopia - Adventures In Utopia BRK 6991

1980
Roger Powell - Air Pocket BRK 6994
Kenny Doss - Movin'on A Feeling
Randy Vanwarmer - Terraform
Foghat - Tight Shoes BRK 6999
Pam Windo and the Shades - It First release using the Warner Bros 3000 catalog number sequence
Brian Briggs - Brian Damage
Utopia - Deface the Music BRK 3487

1981
Paul Butterfield - North-South
Johnny Average Band - Some People 
Todd Rundgren - Healing BHS 3522
Jesse Winchester - Talk Memphis
Donald O'Connor - Come Alive
Willie Mitchell - Listen Dance
Randy Vanwarmer - Beat of Love
Foghat - Girls to Chat and Boys to Bounce BRK 3578

1982
Brian Briggs - Combat Zone
Utopia - Swing To The Right BRK 3666
Todd Rundgren - The Ever Popular Tortured Artist Effect 23732 First release to use the 5 digit Warner Bros. number sequence
Foghat - In The Mood for Something Rude  23747

1983
Nicole Wills - Tell Me
Randy Vanwarmer - The Things That You Dream
NRBQ - Grooves in Orbit
Foghat - Zig-Zag Walk 23888

1984
Human Body - Make You Shake It 23995
Freida Parton - Two-Faced
Todd Rundgren - A Cappella 25128 (Originally slated for release in the summer of 1984 but delayed until after Bearsville folded. Released in October 1985 on the Warner Bros. label using Bearsville catalog number)
The dB's - Like This 25146

See also
Bearsville Studios
List of record labels

References

External links
 
 
 
 
 
 

 
Record labels established in 1970
Record labels disestablished in 1984
Rock record labels
Pop record labels
Blues record labels
Defunct record labels of the United States
1970 establishments in the United States
1984 disestablishments in the United States